The Lyulka AL-5 was a Soviet axial compressor turbojet developed from the Lyulka TR-3 turbojet around 1950. It was flight-tested in a number of prototype aircraft, but was not accepted for production.

Design and development
The Lyulka TR-3A was redesignated as the AL-5 to honor Arkhip Mikhailovich Lyulka in 1950. It was a single-shaft turbojet with a seven-stage axial compressor. It had an annular combustion chamber with 24 nozzles and a single-stage turbine. It had a fixed exhaust nozzle and had a turbine starting unit.

It was used in the Mikoyan-Gurevich I-350, but flamed out when it was throttled back on that aircraft's first flight on 16 June 1951. It was also flown in the Lavochkin La-190 in 1951, but suffered similar problems.

Applications
 Ilyushin Il-46
 Lavochkin La-190
 Mikoyan-Gurevich MiG I-350
 Yakovlev Yak-1000

Specifications (AL-5G)

See also

Notes

Bibliography
 Kay, Anthony L. Turbojet: History and Development 1930–1960: Volume 2: USSR, USA, Japan, France, Canada, Sweden, Switzerland, Italy, Czechoslovakia and Hungary. Marlborough, Wiltshire: Crowood Press, 2007 
 Gunston, Bill. The Osprey Encyclopaedia of Russian Aircraft 1875–1995. London, Osprey, 1995

External links
 https://web.archive.org/web/20150529194952/http://www.ctrl-c.liu.se/misc/RAM/eng_al-5.html

AL-5
1950s turbojet engines